The following is a timeline of the history of Kabul, Afghanistan.

Prior to 20th century

 Circa 1500–1200 B.C. – The Rigveda, a book of Vedic Sanskrit hymns, called this town "Kubha". By about 1000 BC the Zend Avesta of Zoroastrianism mentioned the region and praised it as ideal.
 c. 678–549 BCE. - Kabul valley was part of the Median Empire.
 c. 549 BCE. the Median Empire was annexed by Cyrus The Great and Kabul valley became part the Achaemenid Empire.
 c. 330 BCE. the Achaemenid empire was conquered by Alexander the Great.
 c. 305 BCE. the valley is seized by Alexander's general Seleucus, becoming part of the Seleucid Empire.
 c. 5th century CE – Bala Hissar (fortress) built.
 565 – Kabul Shahi is in power.
 794 – Shahi capital relocated to Kabul from Kapisa.
 1461 – Wali khan Beg is in power.
 1502 – Arghunid Muqim in power.
 1504 – Siege of Kabul; Mughal Babur in power. 
 1528 – Gardens of Babur developed outside city.
 1545 – Mughal Humayun in power.
 1637 – Char Chatta Bazaar built.
 1646 – Shahjahani Mosque built.
 1738 – Persian Nader Shah captures citadel.
 1747 – Ahmad Shah Durrani in power.
 1772 – Timur Shah Naizy in power.
 1773 – Durrani capital relocated to Kabul from Kandahar (approximate date).
 1793 – Timur Shah Mausoleum built.
 1838 – British troops arrive.
 1839 – 7 August: Shah Shujah Durrani in power.
 1841 – 2 November: Uprising against Shah Shujah Durrani.
 1842
 Battle of Kabul.
 19 February: The Jalalabad earthquake caused severe damage and 500 deaths.
 1850 – Char Chatta (bazaar) restored.

 1879
 3 September: British residency attacked.
 October: British occupy Kabul.
 December: Siege of the Sherpur Cantonment.
 1880 - Accession of Abdur Rahman Khan as Emir of Afghanistan.

20th century
 
 1901
 Arg (presidential palace) built.
 Population: 140,000 (estimate).
 1903 – Habibia High School founded.
 1913 – Clock tower built.
 1919
 Mu'arrif-i ma'arif begins publication.
 Id Gah Mosque and Amir 'Abd al-Rahman Mausoleum built.
 1920s
 Shah-Do Shamshira Mosque built.
 Tajbeg Palace and Darul Aman Palace built outside city.
 1922 / 1301 SH
 Lycée Esteqlal established.
 Solar Hijri calendar officially adopted in Afghanistan.
 1923 – Kabul–Darulaman Tramway constructed.
 1924 – Amani High School founded.
 1928 – Paghman Gardens open.
 1931
 Kabul University established.
 National Museum of Afghanistan relocated to Darulaman from Koti Bagcha.
 1933 – 8 November: Mohammed Nadir Shah assassinated.
 1940 – Radio Kabul begins broadcasting with 20 kilowatt transmitter.
 1948 – Ghulam Mohammad Farhad becomes mayor.
 1957 – Sherpur Mosque built.
 1961 – Jangalak neighborhood established.
 1965 – Population: 435,000.

 1967
 Kabul Zoo inaugurated.
 Kabul Golf Club opens outside city.
 1968 – Naghlu Dam begins generating hydroelectric power.
 1969 – Hotel Inter-Continental in business.
 1970 – Kabul Airport in operation (approximate date).
 1973 – Population: 318,094 city; 534,350 urban agglomeration.
 1975 – Rock music festival held.

 1977 – Revolutionary Association of the Women of Afghanistan founded.
 1978
 April: Anti-Daoud demonstrations.
 28 April: Coup.
 1979 – 27 December: Soviet forces occupy city.
 1980 - 22 February: 3 Hut uprising
 1988 – Population: 1,424,400 (estimate).
 1989 – Soviet troops withdraw.
 1992 – April: Battle of Kabul (1992–1996) begins.
 1995 – 6 September: Pakistani embassy sacked.
 1996 – 27 September: Taliban take city.

21st century
 2001
 November: City besieged by United States forces.
 Population: 2,080,000 (estimate).
 2002
 January: Marjan of Kabul Zoo dies.
 Nejat Drug Rehabilitation Centre active.
 September: Bombing. 
 2003
 December: Constitutional convention.
 Khwaja Faqiron Mosque reconstructed.
 Music school established.
 2004
 Jamhuriat Hospital built.
 Sultani Museum established.
 2005
 French Medical Institute for Children established.
 City administrative sectors expand to 18 (from 11).
 Kabul City Center (shopping mall) opens.
 2008
 January: Serena Hotel attack.
 July: Bombing of Indian embassy.
 2009
 February: Raids.
 August: Bombing of NATO building.
 October: Bombing of Indian embassy.
 October: UN attack.
 Air pollution in Kabul reaches annual mean of 86 PM2.5 and 260 PM10, much higher than recommended.
 2010
 January: Muhammad Yunus Nawandish becomes mayor.
 January attack.
 February attack.
 May bombing. 
 2011
 May: Bombing of military hospital.
 June: Inter-Continental Hotel attack.
 September attack.
 December: Bombing at mosque.
 Kabul National Cricket Stadium opens.
 Institute for Afghan Arts & Architecture established.
 2012
 February: Quran burning protests.
 April attacks by Taliban.
 May: Assassination of Arsala Rahmani Daulat.
 Abdul Rahman Mosque and Afghanistan Football Federation stadium open.
 Population: 3,289,000 (estimate).
 2013
 June bombings.
 Presidential palace attack.
 2014
 Restaurant bombing.
 Serena Hotel attack.
 December bombings.
 2015
 Park Palace guesthouse attack.
 Parliament attack.
 7 August attacks.
 10 August bombing.
 22 August bombing.
 Spanish Embassy attack.
 2016
 February bombing.
 April attack.
 Attack on Canadian Embassy guards.
 July bombing near Deh Mazang square.
 1 August attack.
 American University attack.
 September attack.
 November bombing.
 Population: 3,817,241 (estimate).
 2017
 January bombing.
 Supreme Court bombing.
 Hospital attack.
 May bombing.
 3 June bombing.
 June mosque attack.
 24 July bombing.
 Iraqi embassy attack.
 28 December bombing.
 2018
 4 January bombing.
 Inter-Continental Hotel attack.
 Ambulance bombing.
 March bombing.
 22 April bombing.
 30 April bombings.
 August bombing.
 September attacks.
 November bombing.
 2019
 Mosque bombing.
 1 July attack.
 25 July bombings.
 28 July bombing.
 7 August bombing.
 17 August bombing.
 2 and 5 September bombings.
 17 September bombing.
 November bombing.
 2020
 February bombing.
 6 March shooting.
 Gurdwara attack.
 University attack.
 2021
 School bombing.
 Mosque bombing.
 June bombings.
Fall of Kabul

See also
 History of Kabul
 List of rulers of Kabul
 List of newspapers in Kabul
 List of universities in Kabul Province
 List of schools in Kabul
 Timelines of other cities in Afghanistan: Herat
 Timeline of Afghan history

References

Bibliography

Published in 19th century
 
 
 
 
 
 

Published in 20th century
 
 
 
 
 

Published in 21st century

External links

 

Years in Afghanistan

Kabul
Kabul
Kabul